I Ain't Movin is the second studio album by British soul singer-songwriter Des'ree. It was released on 9 May 1994 in the UK, and 5 July 1994 in the US on Epic Records, and features the top 5 smash hit, "You Gotta Be".

Critical reception
Tom Demalon of AllMusic gave the album 4 out of 5 stars, writing that "Des'ree possesses a pleasing vocal delivery, and it serves her well on songs like the slinky, mid-tempo 'Feel So High,' the breezy 'Little Child,' the hypnotic groove of 'Trip on Love' and the confessional title cut."

Singles
Three singles were released from I Ain't Movin: "You Gotta Be", "I Ain't Movin'" and "Little Child". In the US, "Feel So High" was featured on and released as a single from I Ain't Movin''' rather than from Des'ree's debut album Mind Adventures''. The song was added to the re-issue of the UK edition of the album, which was released in 2000. "You Gotta Be" was also remixed and re-released in the UK in 1995. The "Kissing You" single was included as a bonus CD with the Australian reissue of the album in 1997.

Track listing

Personnel
Credits adapted from the album's liner notes.

Production
Produced by Des'ree, Ashley Ingram, Phil Legg, Peter Lord Moreland, V. Jeffrey Smith and Mark "Spike" Stent
Engineers: Peter Moshay, Charlie Smith, V. Jeffrey Smith
Mixing: Phil Legg, Richard Lengyel, Peter Moshay, Charlie Smith, Mark "Spike" Stent
Mastering: Vladimir Meller

Musicians
Drums: Rocky Bryant, Ashley Ingram, V. Jeffrey Smith
Percussion: Norman Hedman, V. Jeffrey Smith
Drum programming: Peter Moshay, V. Jeffrey Smith
Bass: Ashley Ingram, Tracy Wormworth
Guitars: Ashley Ingram, Peter Lord Moreland, Prince Sampson, V. Jeffrey Smith, Tom "T-Bone" Wolk
Keyboards: Ashley Ingram, Peter Lord Moreland, V. Jeffrey Smith
Programming: Ashley Ingram
Backing vocals: Des'ree, Ashley Ingram, Michael Sinclair
String arrangements by Ashley Ingram
Other arrangements by Michael Sinclair

Charts

Certifications and sales

References

1994 albums
Des'ree albums
Epic Records albums